James Elmer Springer (June 17, 1926 - February 19, 2018) was an American professional basketball player. He played in the National Basketball League, Basketball Association of America, and American Basketball League during the early years of modern professional basketball in the United States. Following a standout high school career, Springer began his collegiate career at Indiana State Teacher's College, where he played  one season for Glenn Curtis before completing his collegiate career at Canterbury College in Danville, Indiana.

At Canterbury, he was a member of the basketball team for three seasons, the football and track teams for two seasons.  He was also a member of the Sigma Nu fraternity and the Letterman's Club.

BAA career statistics

Regular season

References

External links

Statistics at statscrew.com

1926 births
2018 deaths
American Basketball League (1925–1955) players
American men's basketball players
Anderson Packers players
Basketball players from Indiana
Canterbury Knights basketball players
Centers (basketball)
Indianapolis Jets players
Indianapolis Kautskys players
Indiana State Sycamores men's basketball players